End Game - Union Multiplayer  is a multiplayer shooter game developed and published by young Burmese developers to raise funds for overthrowing the military government in Myanmar. The game was inspired by the Spring Revolution and the armed resistance against the military government. The End Game has reached the top of the chart in the local Play Store. The game is significant as one of the main fundraisers for the country’s armed resistance movement. As of 2022, the game is banned by the junta. The End Game became the Myanmar's first multiplayer shooter game.

Political significance
The game is developed by two Burmese developers Daniel Kong Thar and Thomas from Shoot and Support, a group of Digital Strike, to raise funds for the overthrowing of the military dictatorship. It overtook Mobile Legends: Bang Bang, which is also enjoyed by the Burmese youths, and reached the top one in the local Play Store. Players can target top generals in the game, including junta leaders Min Aung Hlaing and Soe Win, in addition to frontline soldiers. On 21 September 2022, the junta declared a ban on the video games that simulate combat against regime forces by the opposition-led People's Defence Force (PDF). The order warned that people who have the game on their mobile phones would be arrested.

The developers created the game character to honour of Zayar Thaw, who was unjustly hanged by the State Administration Council. The profits from the game were distributed to the National Unity Government of Myanmar, Karenni Nationalities Defence Force (KNDF), Cobra Column, Student Armed Force and many revolutionary organizations, and a total of 1,800,000 Kyats donated.

References

External links
 

2022 video games
Android (operating system) games
Battle royale games
Esports games
IOS games
Multiplayer video games
Video games developed in Myanmar